Kfar Hitta is a village located in the Byblos District in the Keserwan-Jbeil Governorate  in Lebanon.

References

Populated places in Byblos District